KMMX (100.3 FM), known as "Mix 100.3", is a Top 40 (CHR) radio station licensed to Tahoka, Texas, and serving the greater Lubbock, Texas, area.  its studios are located in south Lubbock on Avenue Q west of I-27, and its transmitter is located south of the city.

History
KMMX-FM originally signed on as "Mix 104.7" as a Soft AC. However, the station suffered from weak signal penetration into the Lubbock market. In the 1990s, a frequency swap with another market allowed KMMX to occupy the 100.3 frequency. By May 1997, the station became more of a CHR leaning Hot AC format with live air personalities, using the slogan "A 50/50 Mix Of The 80s & 90s." This was a response to the loss of KRLB 99.5 "The Music Station," which, as a result of the sale of Mainstream CHR Z102 to KRLB's parent company, changed formats from Hot Adult Contemporary to Classic Rock.

In 1998, KMMX-FM dropped the ".3" from their name to a simplified "Mix 100 - Your Music Fix".  In 1999, the station again changed slogans to "The Best Mix Of The 80s, 90s, & Today".

Briefly in 2003, the station used the slogan "Lubbock's New Number One  Hit Music Station." For much of the 2000s, Mix 100 was "Lubbock's Pop-Rock", a hybrid adult top-40/Hot AC station.  Mix 100 shifted formats to mainstream CHR in 2010, rebranding as “Lubbock’s Hit Music Station”. In 2015, the station resumed using its full frequency in its name as “Mix 100.3”

Programming
Mix 100 became the first radio station in Lubbock to carry the syndicated morning show "The Kidd Kraddick Morning Show" in June 2001.

In fiction
KMMX was the call sign on the side of a car driven by the camera operator of a fictional television news channel 8 station in the episode "On Camera" of Emergency!.

External links
KMMX official website

MMX
Contemporary hit radio stations in the United States
Alpha Media radio stations